Naringenin chalcone is a common chalconoid (or chalcone, not to be confused with the compound chalcone). It is synthesized from 4-coumaroyl-CoA and malonyl-CoA by chalcone synthase (CHS), a key enzyme in the phenylpropanoid pathway. Naringenin chalcone can spontaneously cyclize to naringenin (a flavanone). In plant cells, this process is catalyzed by chalcone isomerase.

References

Chalconoids